Mil Saidi (also Romanized as Mīl Sa‘īdī; also known as Mīr Sa‘īdī) is a village in Jazmurian Rural District, Jazmurian District, Rudbar-e Jonubi County, Kerman Province, Iran. At the 2006 census, its population was 62, in 12 families.

References 

Populated places in Rudbar-e Jonubi County